Rikard Olsvik (6 February 1930 in Aure – 21 August 2017) was a Norwegian politician for the Labour Party.

Personal life
Rikard was the son of Hans Olsvik (1897-1974) and Anna Rosvoll (1897-1977).

Career History
He was elected to the Norwegian Parliament from Møre og Romsdal in 1981, and was re-elected on two occasions.

Olsvik was involved in local politics in Tustna and Rindal, serving as mayor of Rindal from 1971 to 1973. He was also a member of Møre og Romsdal county council during the terms 1975–1979 and 1979–1983.

Death
He died on 21 August 2017 at the age of 87.

References

1930 births
2017 deaths
People from Aure, Norway
Labour Party (Norway) politicians
Members of the Storting
20th-century Norwegian politicians